Sa’ad Abubakar Mohammed  was elected Senator for Gombe Central constituency in Gombe State, Nigeria in April 2003 on the People's Democratic Party (PDP) platform. He held office from May 2003 until May 2007.
He was appointed a member of the committees on Works and on Security and Intelligence.
He did not run for re-election in the April 2007 contest.

References

20th-century births
2021 deaths
Nigerian Muslims
Peoples Democratic Party members of the Senate (Nigeria)
21st-century Nigerian politicians
Year of birth missing
People from Gombe State
Deaths from the COVID-19 pandemic in Nigeria